Ndoc Nikaj (15 June 186416 January 1951) was an Albanian priest, writer, and historian. He was the first Albanian novelist to write and publish an original novel in the Albanian language,  of 1905.

Biography
Born in Shkodër on 15 June 1864, Nikaj was educated in the Albanian Pontifical Seminary and ordained as a priest in 1888. Along with Preng Doçi he was the creator of the Lidhja e Mshehët, which aimed at overthrowing the Ottoman Empire and the creation of an independent Albania. Such league inspired the Albanian Revolt of 1910. Nikaj was one of the founders of the literary society Society for the Unity of the Albanian Language, mostly known in Albanian as Shoqnia Bashkimi.

Nikaj established in 1909 his own printing press, "Shtypshkronja Nikaj" and also founded two newspapers: Koha in 1910 and Besa Shqyptare in 1913. Besa Shqyptare lasted until 1921. The cultural and literary magazine Hylli i Dritës was printed there.

Nikaj is remembered for the two history collections of 1902, "History of Albania" and "History of Turkey" which pushed toward the consolidation of the Catholic identity between Albanians, focusing on Scanderbeg and his wars against the Ottomans. His work was criticized as inexact and tendentious by the Austrian diplomat and historian Theodore Ippen.

Nikaj was arrested in 1921 for unknown reasons, and little is known about him until the end of World War II. He was arrested by the communists in 1946 and died in prison in 1951.

Nonliterary publications
Nikaj's educational, religious and other publications are the following:
 (Rome 1888)
 (Shkodër 1899)
 (Brussels 1902)
 (London 1902)

Literary publications
Nikaj wrote prose most of which is now rare to be found:
 (Shkodër 1892)
 
 (Shkodër 1905)
 (Shkodër 1918)
 (Shkodër 1920)
 (Shkodër 1920)
 (Shkodër 1921)

References

19th-century Albanian historians
Albanian Jesuits
Albanian schoolteachers
Christian writers
1864 births
1951 deaths
People from Shkodër
20th-century Albanian historians
People from Scutari vilayet
19th-century Albanian Roman Catholic priests
20th-century Albanian Roman Catholic priests
20th-century Albanian writers
Albanian novelists
Activists of the Albanian National Awakening
Albanian publishers (people)
Linguists from Albania